During the 1996–97 English football season, Leicester City F.C. competed in the FA Premier League (known as the FA Carling Premiership for sponsorship reasons).

Season summary
Most observers had tipped Leicester for an immediate return to Division One, so Martin O'Neill's ultimate task for this season was to achieve survival for Leicester. However, he defied many of the pre-season predictions by finishing 9th in the table. Leicester's season was capped by a victory over Middlesbrough in the League Cup final to win their first major trophy for 33 years and their passport to the following season's UEFA Europa League.

Final league table

Results summary

Results by round

Results

Pre-season

FA Premier League

FA Cup

League Cup

First-team squad
Squad at end of season

Left club during season

Reserve squad

Transfers

In

Out

Transfers in:  £5,350,000
Transfers out:  £1,425,000
Total spending:  £3,925,000

References

Leicester City F.C. seasons
Leicester City